George Cary may refer to:

Sir George Cary (of Cockington) (died 1617), English administrator in Ireland
George Cary (British Army officer) (1712–1792), British Army general
George Cary (Georgia politician) (1789–1843), congressman from Georgia
George B. Cary (1811–1850), congressman from Virginia
George Cary Eggleston (1839–1911), American writer
George Cary (priest) (1611–1680), Dean of Exeter
George Cary (architect) (1859–1945), American architect

See also
George Carey (disambiguation)